Moscow, Belgium (literally Collision in Moscou) is a 2008 Belgian film directed by Christophe Van Rompaey and written by Jean-Claude Van Rijckeghem and Pat van Beirs.

Moscou is the name of a neighbourhood in Gentbrugge, in the Flemish city of Ghent.

Plot
Mathilda or "Matty" (Barbara Sarafian) is a bitter 41-year-old postal worker in Ghent, Belgium. She finds herself drifting through life, waiting for her husband Werner (Johan Heldenbergh) to decide if he wants to leave his current 22-year-old lover Gail and return to Matty and their three kids.

One day after shopping at the supermarket, Matty backs into a yellow highway tractor in the parking lot. The owner of the truck is 29-year-old Johnny (Jurgen Delnaet). They have an explosive argument over whose fault it is. Johnny rips into Matty and tries to put her in her place, but Matty gets the best of him and earns his respect. The police show up and they file a report. Johnny memorizes Matty's number from the police report and pursues her. He calls several times and one day shows up at her apartment, offering to fix the trunk of her car. At first she acts as though she's annoyed, but she secretly feels amused. After he fixes her car, she invites him to join her family for dinner. They have a good time and after dinner he proposes they go out for a drink. Unwillingly, Matty accepts, assuming it will be harmless. However, during the date, he relentlessly tries to persuade her to spend the night with him. She eventually gives in.

The night they share together rejuvenates her. When Werner learns about Matty's affair with Johnny, he asks a friend at the police station to run a background check. They find out that he did time for an incident wherein he brutally attacked his wife and put her in the hospital for two weeks. One night at dinner, Matty's teenage daughter Vera asks Johnny if the charges are true and he shamefacedly says yes. Disgusted, Vera leaves the table and Matty tries to break things off with Johnny, but he explains that he had had too much to drink that night and after his ex-wife admitted she had been having an affair for three months, he went into a rage. Matty tries to resist his charm but can't, and things continue as though nothing has happened.

Jealous that he might lose Matty, Werner tries to get her back. The three end up having dinner together. Johnny and Werner have an argument at the table, and both leave while Matty hides out in the laundry room. She realizes that Werner is the one making her unhappy and makes the decision to try having a relationship with Johnny. While they are out celebrating her decision, Johnny and Matty run into Johnny's yuppie ex-wife and her lawyer lover. At this point, Johnny is sloshed, having had a few too many drinks. All four end up in a heated argument, and Johnny ends up throwing a beer keg at the lawyer's car, shattering the windshield. Matty is disgusted at Johnny's lack of restraint and leaves. She tries to rekindle her romance with Werner, but there's no passion. A while later, Vera invites Matty to a karaoke bar, where they run into Johnny. He tries to serenade her, but she becomes disgusted again and leaves. She later goes back to try to find him before he departs for Italy.

Cast 
 Barbara Sarafian as Matty
 Jurgen Delnaet as Johnny
 Johan Heldenbergh as Werner
 Anemone Valcke as Vera
 Sofia Ferri as Fien
 Julian Borsani as Peter
 Bob De Moor as Jacques
 Jits Van Belle as Nicky
 Griet van Damme as Nathalie
 Camille Friant as Iris

Awards and nominations
Bermuda Film Festival
Won: Best Narrative Feature (Christophe Van Rompaey)
Cannes Film Festival
Won: ACID Award (Christophe Van Rompaey)
Won: Grand Golden Rail (Van Rompaey)
Won: SACD Screenwriting Award (Jean-Claude Van Rijckeghem and Pat van Beirs)
Denver Film Festival
Won: Best Film (Van Rompaey)
European Film Awards
Nominated: Best Composer (Tuur Florizoone)
Listapad
Won: Best Actress (Barbara Sarafian)
São Paulo Film Festival
Nominated: International Jury Award (Van Rompaey)
World Soundtrack Awards
Won: Public Choice Award (Florizoone)
Nominated: Discovery of the Year (Florizoone)
Zurich Film Festival
Won: New Talent Award (Van Rompaey)

External links 
 IMDb profile

2008 films
2000s Dutch-language films
Belgian LGBT-related films
Ghent in fiction
Belgium in fiction
Films shot in Ghent